Jaaveleh (also Romanized as Ja‘āveleh; also known as Bāmdezh Ja‘āvoleh, Chaqāvoleh, and Jali‘eh) is a village in Elhayi Rural District, in the Central District of Ahvaz County, Khuzestan Province, Iran. At the 2006 census, its population was 157, in 25 families.

References 

Populated places in Ahvaz County